The Tarakhels, (Pashto: تره خیل), are a Pashtun sub-tribe of the Ghiljis mainly found in the Deh Sabz district of Kabul and Laghman but also in parts of northern Afghanistan, such as Baghlan and Samangan. They can trace their origins back to Nomadic Kochis from Zabul.

History

The Tarakhel Pashtuns are originally nomadic Kuchis from Zabul, even today there are still nomadic Tarakhels in Deh Sabz. Before becoming sedentary they were pending between Arghandab in Zabul and Deh Sabz in northeastern Kabul. It was during the Mughal period when Kabul's importance in the region was rapidly increasing, in that period a big chunk of the Tarakhels settled in the province of Kabul and became sedentary. They have participated in the expeditions of Shah Mahmud Hotaki towards Persia, when he first besieged and after captured Isfahan from Sultan Husayn. The settling in northern Afghanistan likely happened during Abdur Rahman Khans reign.

See also
 Pashtun people
 Ghiljis
 Pashtun colonization of northern Afghanistan
 Pashtun tribes

References

Ghilji Pashtun tribes
Pashtun tribes
Ethnic groups in Afghanistan